Croix-des-Bouquets (Creole: Kwadèbouke)  is a town in the Croix-des-Bouquets commune in the Croix-des-Bouquets Arrondissement, in the Ouest department of Haiti. In 2009, the commune had 227,012 inhabitants, making it the most populous city in Ouest department outside of Port-au-Prince Arrondissement.

References

Populated places in Ouest (department)